St. James Episcopal Church is a historic Episcopal church in Muncy, Lycoming County, Pennsylvania, United States.  It was designed by architect Richard Upjohn in 1856, and built between 1857 and 1859.

It was added to the National Register of Historic Places in 1979. It is located in the Muncy Historic District, listed on the National Register of Historic Places in 1980.

References

External links
Church website

Episcopal churches in Pennsylvania
Churches on the National Register of Historic Places in Pennsylvania
Gothic Revival church buildings in Pennsylvania
Churches completed in 1859
19th-century Episcopal church buildings
Churches in Lycoming County, Pennsylvania
National Register of Historic Places in Lycoming County, Pennsylvania
1859 establishments in Pennsylvania
Richard Upjohn church buildings